"Love Don't Live Here Anymore" is a 1978 song by Rose Royce, later covered by a number of artists.

Love Don't Live Here Anymore may also refer to:

 "Love Don't Live Here Anymore", a 1999 song by Kenny Rogers from She Rides Wild Horses
 "Love Don't Live Here Anymore", a 1978 song by Kris Kristofferson and Rita Coolidge from Natural Act
 "Love Don't Live Here Anymore", a 1985 song by Modern Talking from Let's Talk About Love
 "Love Don't Live Here Anymore", a 1992 song by Sven Gali from Sven Gali

See also 
 Love Don't Live Here (disambiguation)